Smalleyus is a genus of crabs in the family Pseudothelphusidae, containing the single species Smalleyus tricristatus.

Smalleyus tricristatus was described by Fernando Alvarez in 1989, based on specimens collected in the Los Tuxtlas region of Veracruz, adjacent to the Gulf of Mexico.

Smalleyus tricristatus is listed as Data Deficient on the IUCN Red List.

References

Pseudothelphusidae
Freshwater crustaceans of North America
Endemic crustaceans of Mexico
Monotypic arthropod genera
Endemic fauna of Los Tuxtlas